Taweewat Hurapan (born 11 April 1950) is a Thai fencer. He competed in the individual and team épée and sabre events at the 1976 Summer Olympics.

References

External links
 

1950 births
Living people
Taweewat Hurapan
Taweewat Hurapan
Fencers at the 1976 Summer Olympics
Taweewat Hurapan
Taweewat Hurapan